This is a list of shopping malls in Bangladesh, sortable by name, location, year opened and size (gross floor area). A shopping mall or shopping center is a building or set of buildings that contain retail units and a multiplex with interconnecting walkways enabling visitors to easily walk from unit to unit, of fering diverse brands and utilities at the same place. Bangladesh has some of the largest shopping malls in South Asia.

Largest malls

Dhaka

 Jamuna Future Park 
 Bashundhara City 
 Mouchak Market 
 New Market
 Rajlaxmi Complex

References

Bangladesh
Shopping malls